A sword is a cutting and/or thrusting weapon.

Sword, Swords, or The Sword may also refer to:

Places
 Swords, Dublin, a large suburban town in the Irish capital 
 Swords, Georgia, a community in the United States
 Sword Beach, code name for the Normandy Coast landing area on D-day in World War II

Arts, media, and entertainment

Film and television
 Swords (TV series), a documentary TV series on the Discovery Channel
 The Sword (1980 film), a 1980 film by Patrick Tam Kar-Ming
 Ken (film), a 1964 Japanese film also known as "The Sword"
 "The Sword", an episode of the DiC cartoon G.I. Joe: A Real American Hero

Literature 
 S.W.O.R.D. (comics), a fictional counterterrorism and intelligence agency in Marvel Comics
 S.W.O.R.D. (The Saint), a fictional criminal organization in the novel The Saint and the Fiction Makers
 The Sword (magazine), the magazine of the British Fencing Association
 The Sword (comics), a comic book series from the Luna Brothers
 , a fictional submarine in Jules Verne's novel Facing the Flag
 The Sword, a novel by Deborah Chester

Music 
 Sword (band), a Canadian heavy metal band
 Swords (band), an indie rock band
 The Sword, an American heavy metal band
 Swords (album), a compilation album of b-sides from Morrissey's studio releases
 "Swords" (Leftfield song), 2000
 "Swords" (M.I.A. song), 2016

Other media 
 The SWORD Project, the CrossWire Bible Society's Bible software project
 Sword, an opponent in the video game Yie Ar Kung-Fu
 TheSword.com, a gay news and lifestyle website
 Pokémon Sword, one of the two paired Pokémon Sword and Shield games for the Nintendo Switch

Business and technology
 SWORD (protocol), a network storage protocol
 SWORDS, a ground-based military robot
 SWORD-financing, a special form of raising capital

Other uses
 The Sword (public house), a pub in Gloucester, England
 The Sword of Moses, an apocryphal book of magic
 Suit of swords, a suit in Latin-suited playing cards and Tarot decks
 , a proposed ship of the Royal Navy

People with the name
 Carolyn Swords (born 1989), American basketball player
 Kevin Swords (born 1960), American rugby player
 Kyle Swords (born 1974), American soccer player
 Sam Sword (born 1974), American football player
 Tommy Sword (born 1957), British football player

See also 
 SORD
 Sord M5